The 2012–13 season was Preston North End's 124th year in The Football League and their second consecutive in the third tier.

League One data

League table

Results summary

Kit

|
|
|
|
|
|

Squad

Season statistics

Starts and goals

|-
|colspan="14"|Players who have left the club:

|}

Goalscorers record

Disciplinary record

Transfers

In

Loans In

Out

Loans Out

Results

Pre-season friendlies

League One

FA Cup

League Cup

League Trophy

Overall

References

External links
 Official Site: 2012/2013 Fixtures & Results
 BBC Sport – Club Stats
 Soccerbase – Results | Squad Stats | Transfers

Preston North End
Preston North End F.C. seasons